Sullivan & Son is a TBS sitcom created by Steve Byrne and Rob Long. The series premiered on July 19, 2012, and follows Steve Sullivan, who surprises his parents when he leaves his job behind as a corporate lawyer to take over a bar owned by his father.

On November 20, 2014, the show was cancelled after 33 episodes and its third season.

Series overview

Episodes

Season 1 (2012)

Season 2 (2013)

Season 3 (2014)

References

External links
 
 

2010s television-related lists
Lists of American sitcom episodes